Throope Down is a 34.4 hectare biological Site of Special Scientific Interest in Wiltshire, England, on chalk grassland in Bishopstone parish south-east of Salisbury. The site was notified in 1971 and again in 1986.

Sources

 

Sites of Special Scientific Interest in Wiltshire
Sites of Special Scientific Interest notified in 1971